William Marischal Astwood was a member of the Parliament of Bermuda for Warwick East.

References 

United Bermuda Party politicians
Members of the Parliament of Bermuda
Living people
Year of birth missing (living people)